Julius Hans Weigel (29 May 1908, Vienna – 12 August 1991, Maria Enzersdorf) was an Austrian Jewish writer and a theater critic. He lived in Vienna, except during the period between 1938 and 1945, when he lived in exile in Switzerland. He was a lifetime companion of the Austrian actress Elfriede Ott.

Biography 
During the time before the Anschluss of Austria, i.e. the annexation by Nazi Germany in 1938, he worked at Viennese cabaret theaters. After his return from Switzerland, where he lived in exile (1938 – 1945), he wrote critical reviews about theater plays for the Austrian newspapers Kurier and Neues Österreich. Jointly with Friedrich Torberg he was responsible for the boycott in Austrian theaters of Bertolt Brecht whom he rejected because of Brecht's communist convictions.

Between 1951 and 1954, Hans Weigel edited the anthology Stimmen der Gegenwart (Voices from the Present), which fostered young writers. Today, his name is used by the Subsidy for Literature of Lower Austria. Weigel adapted comedies by Johann Nepomuk Nestroy and translated Molière. He collaborated with the annual Nestroy Theater Festival on Burg Liechtenstein, whose art director was Elfriede Ott.

Awards and accomplishments 
 1972: City of Vienna Prize for Journalism
 1977: Johann Nestroy Ring
 1982: Ehrenring by the City of Vienna
 Austrian Cross of Honour for Science and Art, 1st class

Works (selection)
 Lern dieses Volk der Hirten kennen. Versuch einer freundlichen Annäherung an die Schweizerische Eidgenossenschaft. Zurich: Artemis 1962
 Karl Kraus oder Die Macht der Ohnmacht. Versuch eines Motivenberichts zur Erhellung eines vielfachen Lebenswerks. Vienna; Frankfurt; Zurich: Molden, 1968
 Die Leiden der jungen Wörter. Ein Antiwörterbuch. Zurich, Munich: Artemis-Verlag, 1974, 
 Flucht vor der Größe. Graz, Wien, Köln (Verlag Styria), 1978, illustriert von Hans Fronius, 
 Das Land der Deutschen mit der Seele suchend, Diogenes Verlag, Zurich 1983, 
 Niemandsland. Ein autobiographischer Roman. Ed. by Elfriede Ott and Veronika Silberbauer. Vienna: Amalthea, 2006,

Notes

External links 

 Article (in German) about Hans Weigel
 
 

Austrian male writers
Austrian Jews
Writers from Vienna
1908 births
1991 deaths
Recipients of the Austrian Cross of Honour for Science and Art, 1st class
Commanders Crosses of the Order of Merit of the Federal Republic of Germany